The 2018–19 season was Galatasarays 115th in existence and 61st consecutive season in the Süper Lig. The club became Turkish champions for the 22nd time in their history, and won a second consecutive Süper Lig title following their success in the previous season.

In Europe, Galatasaray competed in the UEFA Champions League, as well as the UEFA Europa League, the Turkish Cup and the Turkish Super Cup.

This article shows statistics of the club's players in the season, and also lists all matches that the club played during the season. The season covered a period from 1 July 2018 to 30 June 2019.

Club

Technical Staff

Board of Directors

Grounds

Kit
Supplier: Nike
Chest sponsor (Domestic competitions): Nef
Chest sponsor (European competitions): Turkish Airlines
Back sponsor: MOOV by Garenta
Sleeve sponsor: Bilyoner.com
Short sponsor: Fluo
Socks sponsor: Jeunesse Global

Sponsorship
Companies that Galatasaray had sponsorship deals with during the season included the following.

Updated October 2018

Players

Squad information

Other players under contract
Not eligible to play matches

Transfers

In

Total spending: €25.45M

Out

Total income: €32.15M 

Expenditure: €10.7M

Pre-season and friendlies

Competitions

Overview

Süper Lig

Standings

Results summary

Results by round

Matches

Turkish Super Cup

Turkish Cup

Fifth round

Round of 16

Quarter-finals

Galatasaray won on away goals.

Semi-finals

Final

UEFA Champions League

Group stage

UEFA Europa League

Round of 32

Statistics

Squad statistics

Clean sheets

Attendances

 Sold season tickets: 35,600

See also
 2018–19 Süper Lig
 2018–19 Turkish Cup
 2018–19 UEFA Champions League
 2018–19 UEFA Europa League

References

External links
Galatasaray Sports Club Official Website 
Turkish Football Federation - Galatasaray A.Ş. 
uefa.com - Galatasaray AŞ

2018-19
Turkish football clubs 2018–19 season
2018-19
2018 in Istanbul
2019 in Istanbul
Galatasaray Sports Club 2018–19 season